The following is a list of Michigan State Historic Sites in Ionia County, Michigan. Sites marked with a dagger (†) are also listed on the National Register of Historic Places in Ionia County, Michigan.


Current listings

See also
 National Register of Historic Places listings in Ionia County, Michigan

Sources
 Historic Sites Online – Ionia County. Michigan State Housing Developmental Authority. Accessed February 10, 2011.

References

Ionia County
State Historic Sites